National Association for the Advancement of Colored People v. Alabama, 357 U.S. 449 (1958), was a landmark decision of the US Supreme Court.  Alabama sought to prevent the NAACP from conducting further business in the state. After the circuit court issued a restraining order, the state issued a subpoena for various records, including the NAACP's membership lists.  The Supreme Court ruled that Alabama's demand for the lists had violated the right of due process guaranteed by the Fourteenth Amendment to the United States Constitution.

Facts
In 1956, the Attorney General of Alabama, John Patterson, brought a suit to the State Circuit Court of Montgomery, Alabama, challenging the National Association for the Advancement of Colored People (NAACP) for violation of a state statute requiring foreign corporations to qualify before doing business in the state. The NAACP, a nonprofit membership corporation based in New York, had not complied with the statute, as it believed it was exempt. The state suit sought both to prevent the Association from conducting further business within the state and, indeed, to remove it from the state.

Referring to the Association's involvement with the Montgomery bus boycott in 1955 and its role in funding and providing legal assistance to black students' seeking admission to the state university, the suit charged that the Association was "...causing irreparable injury to the property and civil rights of the residents and citizens of the State of Alabama for which criminal prosecution and civil actions at law afford no adequate relief...." On the day this suit was filed, the circuit court agreed to issue an ex parte order restraining the Association from conducting business in the state or taking steps to qualify it to do so.

The Association, represented throughout by Robert L. Carter of the NAACP Legal Defense Fund, responded by moving to dissolve the order on the grounds that its activities within the state did not require its qualification under the statute and that the state's suit was intended to violate its rights to freedom of speech and of assembly as guaranteed by the Constitution of the United States. Before a hearing date was set, the state issued a subpoena for much of the Association's records, including bank statements and leases, but most notably the names and addresses of the "agents" or "members" of the Association in Alabama.

In its response to the lawsuit, the Association admitted that it was in breach of the statute and offered to obtain qualification to continue business if that part of the ex parte order was lifted.  Because the Association did not comply with the order to produce its records, that motion was denied and the Association was held in contempt and fined $10,000. The contempt order allowed for the reduction or remission of the fine if the production order was complied with within five days, after which the fine would be raised to $100,000.

Contending that the State could not constitutionally force disclosure of the records, the Association moved to dismiss the contempt judgment once more. According to Alabama case law, however, a petitioner could not seek a hearing or to dissolve an order until it purged itself of contempt.

The United States Supreme Court reversed the first contempt judgment. The Alabama Supreme Court then claimed the U.S. Supreme Court had relied on a "mistaken premise" and reinstated the contempt judgment, which the U.S. Supreme Court reversed again. The NAACP moved to try the case on the merits; this motion was denied and again appealed up to the U.S. Supreme Court, which remanded the case to Alabama, and ordered the Federal district court to try the case on the merits if the Alabama court system continued to refuse to do so.

The Alabama state circuit court finally heard the case on the merits, and decided the NAACP had violated Alabama law and ordered it to stop doing business in the state; the Alabama appeals courts upheld this judgment, refusing to hear the NAACP's appeals on Constitutional grounds.  Finally, the fourth time the case was heard by the U.S. Supreme Court, it granted certiorari and decided the case, itself, on the merits rather than remand the case to the balking Alabama court system, which had taken five years to get this far.

Judgment
In an opinion delivered by Justice John Marshall Harlan II, the Supreme Court decided in favor of the petitioners, holding that "Immunity from state scrutiny of petitioner's membership lists is here so related to the right of petitioner's members to pursue their lawful private interests privately and to associate freely with others in doing so as to come within the protection of the Fourteenth Amendment" and, further, that freedom to associate with organizations dedicated to the "advancement of beliefs and ideas" is an inseparable part of the Due Process Clause of the Fourteenth Amendment. The action of the state's obtaining the names of the Association's membership would likely interfere with the free association of its members, so the state's interest in obtaining the records was superseded by the constitutional rights of the petitioners. Harlan said the following.

See also
 Freedom of association
Bates v. City of Little Rock (1960)
Talley v. California (1960)
Roberts v. United States Jaycees (1984)
Hurley v. Irish-American Gay, Lesbian, and Bisexual Group of Boston (1995)
Boy Scouts of America v. Dale (2000)
 Bruce Bennett, the Arkansas Attorney General  sought in 1958 to impose limitations on the NAACP comparable to what had been done in Alabama.
 List of landmark African-American legislation

References

External links
 
NAACP Banned in Alabama ~ Civil Rights Movement Archive

Civil rights movement case law
1958 in United States case law
United States freedom of association case law
v. Alabama
1958 in Alabama
United States due process case law
African-American history of Alabama
United States Supreme Court cases of the Warren Court
United States Supreme Court cases